Stuart Kershaw is an English songwriter and musician who performs as drummer of English electronic group Orchestral Manoeuvres in the Dark (OMD). Kershaw has worked with the band in various capacities since 1991, and in 2015, became the full-time replacement for original drummer Malcolm Holmes. He is credited as a co-writer on multiple OMD releases, including the 1991 UK No. 3 hit, "Sailing on the Seven Seas".

In 1998, Kershaw co-founded girl group Atomic Kitten, alongside OMD frontman Andy McCluskey. Together they co-wrote much of the group's material, including the 2001 UK chart-topper, "Whole Again".  

Kershaw is a long time Liverpool Football Club fan. He and his wife have two children.

References

British male drummers
English drummers
English songwriters
Musicians from Bradford
Orchestral Manoeuvres in the Dark members
Living people
Year of birth missing (living people)
British male songwriters